The Sinfonia Educational Foundation (SEF) is the philanthropic arm of the Phi Mu Alpha Sinfonia Music Fraternity.

SEF scholarships, grants, and programs

Scholarships
Sinfonia Educational Foundation ($5,000, $2,500)

James H. Patrenos Memorial Scholarship ($1,000)

W. Eldridge and Emily Lowe Scholarship ($1,000)

Delta Iota Alumni Scholarship ($500)

Grants
Travel Reimbursement Grants
Chapter/Province Matching Grants
Overseas Travel Grants
Research Assistance Grants

Programs
Leadership Institute
Sinfonia Winds

History
SEF began in 1954 as the Sinfonia Foundation. Over its first 50 years, the SEF changed its direction several times. In many cases, the SEF's mission was much more oriented to promoting music in America, American artists, and American music professionals.  In the 21st century, the SEF's mission has become much more oriented towards developing the leadership skills of collegiate members of Phi Mu Alpha Sinfonia Fraternity. In 2003,SEF became the Sinfonia Educational Foundation.

In 2006, the Board of Trustees hired Matthew Garber, the SEF's first Director of Development, to increase the SEF endowment and expand its programs. Garber left SEF in January 2009. At that time the Foundation announced it wouldn't seek a replacement.

External links
Official Site of the Sinfonia Educational Foundation
Official Site of Phi Mu Alpha Sinfonia Fraternity

References 

Educational foundations in the United States
Phi Mu Alpha Sinfonia
Education in Evansville, Indiana
Culture of Evansville, Indiana